Henry Holcombe Tucker (May 10, 1819 – September 9, 1889) was the chancellor of the University of Georgia in Athens, Georgia from 1874 until his resignation in 1878.  Note that the head of the University was referred to as chancellor instead of president from 1860 until 1932.  Tucker was president of Mercer University in Macon, Georgia from 1866 to 1871.

Early life
Tucker was born on May 10, 1819 near Camak, Georgia, the son of Germain Tucker (1794-1821) and his wife Frances Henrietta (née Holcombe). After the early death of Germain Tucker, his widow married a Mr. Hoff and spent many years in Philadelphia, Pennsylvania, before returning to Georgia. Henry Holcombe Tucker's paternal grandfather, Isaiah Tucker, had been born in Amherst, Virginia, and was himself the grandson of Francis Tucker of St. George's, Bermuda, who had emigrated to, and married in, Virginia. The Tucker's of Bermuda are a prominent family in the British Overseas Territory, that date back to the 1616 appointment of Daniel Tucker as Governor of Bermuda, and the family included many other prominent Henry Tuckers. Henry Holcombe Tucker's maternal grandfather was the Reverend Henry Holcombe, D.D.

Henry Holcombe Tucker received a B.A. from the Columbian College at the George Washington University in 1838.

He married Mary C. West in 1848. She died less than a year later.

Henry Holcombe Tucker died in Atlanta on September 9, 1889, after falling from a window.

References

History of the University of Georgia by Thomas Walter Reed; Frontmatter and Chapter I: The Beginnings of the University, Thomas Walter Reed,  Imprint:  Athens, Georgia : University of Georgia, ca. 1949
From Ahmedunggar to Lavonia Presidents at the University of Georgia 1785-1997, University of Georgia Libraries, Hargrett Rare Book and Manuscript Library 
Kenneth K. Krakow, Georgia Place-names:Their History and Origins, p.232, 3rd Ed., 1975, Winship Press (Macon, Georgia)

1819 births
1889 deaths
Presidents of the University of Georgia
Presidents of Mercer University
People from Warren County, Georgia
Columbian College of Arts and Sciences alumni